Valentina Gardellin (born 13 February 1970) is an Italian basketball player. She competed in the women's tournament at the 1996 Summer Olympics.

References

1970 births
Living people
Italian women's basketball players
Olympic basketball players of Italy
Basketball players at the 1996 Summer Olympics
Sportspeople from Venice